Minuscule 334 (in the Gregory-Aland numbering), Zε22 (Soden), is a Greek minuscule manuscript of the New Testament, on parchment. Paleographically it has been assigned to the 12th century. 
It has marginalia.

Description 

The codex contains the text of the Gospel of Matthew and Gospel of Mark on 271 parchment leaves with a commentary. The text is written in one column per page, in 30 lines per page. The biblical text is surrounded by a catenae.

Text 

The Greek text of the codex is a representative of the Byzantine text-type. Aland placed it in Category V.

History 

The manuscript was added to the list of New Testament manuscripts by Scholz (1794-1852).
It was examined by Burgon. C. R. Gregory saw it in 1886.

The manuscript is currently housed at the Turin National University Library (B. III. 8) in Turin.

See also 

 List of New Testament minuscules
 Biblical manuscript
 Textual criticism

References

Further reading 

 Giuseppe Passino, Codices Manuscripti Bibliohecae Regii Taurinensis Athenaei, Turin 1742, Teil 2.

Greek New Testament minuscules
12th-century biblical manuscripts